The Pellegrini Quartet is a string quartet named after its first violinist Antonio Pellegrini, founded in 1989 in Freiburg im Breisgau.

Presentation 

The ensemble juxtaposes the traditional and the experimental. Its repertoire includes works of the Renaissance, the Baroque, the Viennese Classic (Haydn, Mozart, Beethoven), the early modern (Alexander von Zemlinsky, Hanns Eisler), and composers of the second half of the 20th century (among others Morton Feldman, John Cage, Luigi Nono and Giacinto Scelsi). The Pellegrini Quartet has worked closely with contemporary composers Klaus Huber, Péter Eötvös, Salvatore Sciarrino and Walter Levin. The quartet has performed works by Adriana Hölszky ("Suspension bridges - string quartet to Schubert"), Erhard Grosskopf (12 pieces for String Quartet - String Quartet No. 4), Peter Kleindienst ("What Power Art") and Juliane Klein.

Their discography focuses on works by contemporary composers.

Members 
 Antonio Pellegrini - violin
 Thomas Hofer - violin
 Fabio Marano - viola
 Helmut Menzler - cello

Former member 
 Charlotte Geselbracht – viola (until 1993)

References

External links 
 
 Pellegrini-Quartett on Discogs
 Karl Amadeus Hartmann: Quartetto per archi n.2 (1945/1946) (YouTube)

German string quartets
Musical groups established in 1989